Lockney High School is a public high school located in the city of Lockney, Texas, USA and classified as a 2A school by the UIL.  It is a part of the Lockney Independent School District located in northwestern Floyd County.  In 2015, the school was rated "Met Standard" by the Texas Education Agency.

2009 Fire
A fire on January 11, 2009 destroyed the 80-year-old Lockney High School building and damaged the junior high building.  Arson was suspected in the blaze.

Athletics
The Lockney Longhorns compete in these sports - 

Cross Country, Football, Basketball, Powerlifting, Tennis, Track, Baseball & Softball

State Titles
Boys Cross Country  - 
1985(2A), 1986(2A)

References

External links
Lockney ISD website

Public high schools in Texas
Schools in Floyd County, Texas
1929 establishments in Texas